The  was a gold mine located in the city of Kōshū, Yamanashi, Japan which was in operation for several hundred years from the Sengoku period into the modern era.

Overview
Kai Province, the ancestral home of the Takeda clan is a very mountainous area which is rich in mineral resources. After Takeda Shingen seized power from his father and unified the province, he developed the gold resources which were known to exist in various areas of the province, minting gold coins called "Kōshū kin", which were in great demand due to their purity. 

The Kurokawa mine is located on the hillside of Mount Keikan (also known as Mount Kurokawa) in the northeastern part of the prefecture, at an elevation of 1350 to 1400 meters. Gold in the form of gold dust was known to have been extracted from the area since at least the early Kamakura period, however, exploitation began in earnest by Takeda Shingen and the locations of more than thirty mineheads and a smelter ruins have been found in this area, along with a  mining town. Production is estimated to have reached its peak during the tenure of his son, Takeda Katsuyori. After the fall of the Takeda clan, Kai Province came under the control of Tokugawa Ieyasu, and the mines continued to operate into the Edo period under the control of the Tokugawa shogunate. Archaeological excavation has found  mining tools such as mortars and chisels, ceramics, and daily necessities such as copper coins. Gold extraction was done by gold panning as well as open pit mining and tunneling. References to the mine disappear from historical records around the Genroku era (1688-1703). An attempt was made to reopen the mine in 1906, but the venture failed after two years. the Kurokawa mine is about 60 minutes by car from Enzan Station on the JR Tōkai Chūō Main Line.  

The Nakayama mine is located in Minobu, Yamanashi in the southern part of the prefecture on the slopes of Mount Kenashi at an elevation of 1400 to 1600 meters. The site covers 16.36 hectares, and 124 mine heads have been identified.The site has a flat area where the residences of the workers and a smelter once existed and extensive tailing piles. Its history parallels that of the Kurokawa Mine, and it was controlled by the Anayama clan, retainers of the Takeda clan, and later of the Tokugawa. The mine was first mentioned in official documents in 1571 and was closed at the end of the 17th century.

See also
List of Historic Sites of Japan (Yamanashi)
List of mines in Japan
Sado mine

References

External links
Minobu town official home page 
 Kōshū city official home page 

Sengoku period
History of Yamanashi Prefecture
 Kōshū, Yamanashi
Minobu, Yamanashi
Historic Sites of Japan
Kai Province
Gold mines in Japan
Former mines in Japan